Corona Lodge was constructed as a Masonic Society Lodge in 1902. It is situated on stand 62 (1494) on O’Reilly Road in the Berea district of Johannesburg. Corona Lodge is one of the few remaining original buildings in this part of the city. The architect of the original building was J A Cope Christie.

History
The foundation stone of the building was laid by W Bro. S. Sykes W.M. on 1 November 1902.

The Corona Lodge fell out of use around 1920. When Coronoa Lodge was taken over by the Palestine Society in about 1935 it became the meeting place for the Jewish Society and the Jewish community from Palestine who settled in Berea. As this community dispersed the building was used no longer as a place of religion.

In 1985, the decision was made that it should be sold and although rights were held for the development of a twenty-storey block of flats, it was proposed to convert the lodge to office accommodation.

Design

The original building comprised a two-storey structure facing onto O’Reilly Road and the single storey lodge was behind this. At some stage the single storey building was razed by fire.

The building is constructed in brown brick with a projecting curved bay to the entrance. The ground floor is in brown brick, whilst the first floor has brown brick surrounds to the windows only with white render between. Stained glass and decorative grilles adorn the windows. Black and white tiles provide an elegant floor to the entrance hall. Other significant features include pressed ceilings, barrel vault skylight and double volume board room.

The adaptation of the building for office use was undertaken by architects Montgomerie Oldfield Kirby Denn Brobbelaar. The architects of the project received an ISAA award of merit for their design solution, which included sensitive conversion and a sympathetic three storey extension to the rear. The interior is a total of 976 square metres.

Heritage Status
The Corona Lodge is historically and culturally significant for the following reasons:
 The Corona Lodge is associated with renowned architect J A Cope Christie
 Corona Lodge is associated with both the Masonic Lodge and the Jewish Community, giving it cultural and social significance 
 Corona Lodge has an attractive yet understated facade and has design value
 Corona Lodge is one of very few low rise buildings remaining in the city centre
 Corona Lodge was built in 1902 and so qualifies as a heritage asset on the grounds it has been in existence for sixty years or more

References

Buildings and structures in Johannesburg
Buildings and structures completed in 1902
Heritage Buildings in Johannesburg
20th-century architecture in South Africa